The Discovery of North-West Passage Act 1744 (18 Geo. II, c.17) was an Act of Parliament of the Parliament of Great Britain passed in 1745 and repealed in 1818. It offered a public reward for the successful discovery of a Northwest Passage from the Atlantic to the Pacific.

The preamble to the Act stated the expected economic benefits of the discovery of the passage, and that it would be "a great encouragement to adventurers" to offer a prize. The allocated sum was 20,000l, to be paid to the owners of the first ships to successfully make such a passage.

The Act established a group of commissioners to determine the validity of any claims, and restricted the scope of the Act to only apply to British subjects. It further required all British subjects to provide help and assistance to the explorers when required.

The Act was repealed by section 9 of the Discovery of Longitude at Sea, etc. Act 1818 (58 Geo.3 c.20).

References
The statutes at large from the 15th to the 20th year of King George III [vol. XVIII]; Charles Bathurst, London. 1765.
Chronological table of the statutes; HMSO, London. 1993. 

Great Britain Acts of Parliament 1744
Repealed Great Britain Acts of Parliament
Exploration of the Arctic